Detlev Vogel (born 1942) is a German historian who specialises in the history of Nazi Germany and World War II. He has been a long-time employee of the German Military History Research Office (MGFA). Vogel was a contributor to two volumes of the seminal work Germany and the Second World War from the MGFA.

Historian of Nazi Germany
Vogel's research into treason in Nazi Germany, in partnership with Wolfram Wette, was the first such project undertaken in Germany.  Their resulting book The Last Taboo (2007) showed that, based on the documents examined so far, the soldiers acted mostly out of ethical motives and none of their actions caused harm to civilians or military personnel.  It played a role in bringing about the legislative change in 2009 Germany, when the Bundestag passed legislation officially rehabilitating military personnel judged "traitors" by the military justice system during World War II.

Selected works

In English
Germany and the Second World War
Vol. III: The Mediterranean, South-East Europe, and North Africa 1939–1942, with Gerhard Schreiber and Bernd Stegemann
Vol. VII: The Strategic Air War in Europe and the War in the West and East Asia 1943–1944/5, with Horst Boog and 

References

 
 

External links
Online learning site for The Last Taboo, via  the '' web site (In German)

1942 births
Living people
German military historians
Historians of World War II
German male non-fiction writers
Military History Research Office (Germany) personnel
20th-century German historians